Gualandi is a family from Pisa.

In the Middle Ages this family supported the Ghibellines and it was one of the family that the archbishop Ruggieri degli Ubaldini incited against Ugolino della Gherardesca. The Gualandi family is cited by Dante Alighieri in the Inferno (XXXIII, 32).

Italian noble families